Damjan Marčeta (born 11 May 1994) is a Serbian footballer who plays as a forward for Regionalliga West club SV Rödinghausen.

Career
Marčeta is product of Vojvodina's youth school. He was loaned at Prvi Maj Ruma but did not play for first team of Vojvodina. He joined Donji Srem in 2013. He scored his first goal for Donji Srem in an 2–2 draw in the Serbian SuperLiga on 15 September 2013 away to Red Star Belgrade.

In November 2015, Marčeta moved to Germany and joined FC Tempo in Frankfurt. In the beginning of 2016, he then Rot-Weiss Frankfurt after scoring two goals for the club's reserve team in his debut. He played 11 league games and scored four goals. In the summer 2016, he went on a trial with Kickers Offenbach. After scoring seven goals within 45 minutes in a friendly game for the club, Kickers Offenbach revealed that they wanted to sign him. He agreed to sign with the club and they offered him a contract until June 2018, but however, Marčeta had no work permit in Germany and the deal was never finalized. He then returned to FC Tempo.

In January 2017 Marčeta moved to SC Teutonia Watzenborn-Steinberg. The club changed name to FC Gießen on 1 July 2018. He was part of the team winning the 2018–19 Hessenliga, in which Marčeta contributed with 25 goals in 26 appearances. After his successful season, he moved to FC Homburg in 2019. On 28 January 2022, he joined Regionalliga West club SV Rödinghausen.

Career statistics

Honours
FC Gießen
 Hessenliga: 2018–19

References

External links
 
 
 Stats at utakmica.rs

1994 births
Living people
People from Sanski Most
Serbian footballers
Association football forwards
Serbian SuperLiga players
Regionalliga players
FK Donji Srem players
Rot-Weiss Frankfurt players
FC Gießen players
FC 08 Homburg players
SV Rödinghausen players
Serbs of Bosnia and Herzegovina
Bosnia and Herzegovina emigrants to Serbia
Serbian expatriate footballers
Serbian expatriate sportspeople in Germany
Expatriate footballers in Germany